The Judo competition in the 2009 Summer Universiade were held in Belgrade, Serbia.

Medal overview

Men's events

Women's events

Medal table

External links
 

2009 Summer Universiade
U
2009
Judo competitions in Serbia